James Greer could refer to:

James Agustin Greer (1833–1904), American naval officer
Jim Greer (born 1962), American politician and businessman
James Greer (writer) (born 1971), American novelist, screenwriter, and musician
James Greer, fictional character in Tom Clancy's Ryanverse